Lazyboy may refer to:

 Lazyboy (musical project) or Lazy B, a musical project started by Aqua member Søren Nystrøm Rasted
 Lazyboy (band), a British band composed of Rob da Bank and Dan Carey
 La-Z-Boy, a furniture company based in Monroe, Michigan, United States